Evinrude Outboard Motors was a North American company that built a major brand of  two-stroke outboard motors for boats. Founded by Ole Evinrude in Milwaukee, Wisconsin in 1907, it was formerly owned by the publicly traded Outboard Marine Corporation (OMC) since 1935 but OMC filed for bankruptcy in 2000.  It was working as a subsidiary of Canadian Multinational Bombardier Recreational Products but was discontinued in May of 2020.

Product 
They used carburetors until the late 1990s when EPA clean air regulations mandated new technologies. OMC partnered with FICHT of Germany to introduce direct injection. Extensive and thorough durability testing took place to assess the rigor and longevity of the design but the first design did not pass testing standards.

Initial production of the first design started prior to another round of EPA regulations. At the beginning, the company tried retrofitting the previous design in order to bring the motors up to the new standards. These modifications were not carefully engineered or designed and caused significant engine failures, most notably the powerhead failure.  This eventually resulted in a recall of that generation of motors.  The losses on these motors, the loss of reputation and the surge of competition from Japan and Mercury pushed the company into bankruptcy in 2000.

In 2001, Bombardier acquired the Evinrude and Johnson Outboards brands; the FICHT technology was re-engineered into E-TEC direct injection. This improved fuel efficiency and reduced emissions, oil consumption, noise levels and maintenance needs. This is due in part to a pinpoint oiling system that only applies oil to the necessary components, unlike the original two-stroke motors.  Evinrude E-TEC was the first outboard engine technology to win the US Environmental Protection Agency's 2004 Clean Air Excellence Award which recognizes low emission levels.

According to the EPA, it is also recognized as acceptable for use by the European Union. "Compared to a similar 2004 four-stroke engine, carbon monoxide emissions with Evinrude E-TEC are typically 30 to 50 percent lower; and at idle are lower by a factor of 50 to 100 times. In addition, Evinrude E-TEC emits 30 to 40 percent less total particulate matter on a weight basis than a similar “ultra-low emissions” four-stroke outboard. Furthermore, oxides of nitrogen and hydrocarbon emissions for Evinrude E-TEC are similar, if not lower, than a four-stroke outboard. There are no oil changes with this engine, as well as no belts, and no valve or throttle linkage adjustments. This makes Evinrude E-TEC engines easier to own than comparable four-stroke engines. In addition, numerous advancements combine to create the Evinrude E-TEC quiet signature sound including an exclusive idle air bypass circuit."

All modern Evinrude motors were built and assembled in Sturtevant, Wisconsin, south of Milwaukee.

History 

Ole Evinrude was born in Gjøvik, Norway on April 19, 1877; five years later, his family emigrated to the United States, settling near Cambridge, Wisconsin. Interested in mechanics from an early age, Evinrude became an apprentice machinist at age 16 and eventually a master pattern maker, as well.

Along with a growing number of people at the turn of the century, Ole Evinrude was fascinated by the potential of the newly developed internal combustion engine, and he set up a firm to build small engines.  The idea for Ole Evinrude's invention, a detachable internal-combustion engine mounted on outboard brackets or on the stern of a boat, first took root in the early 1900s. A pattern maker by trade, Ole Evinrude built his first outboard motor in 1907. To this day, outboard motors employ basically the same technology: a vertical crankshaft, horizontal flywheels, and set of bevel gears, but modern motors propel boats faster than the 1907 version (150 mph versus 5 mph).

While Evinrude concentrated on the mechanical and engineering aspects of the new firm, he entrusted the bookkeeping and business end of the firm to his assistant, Bessie Cary. The story surrounding Evinrude's invention of the outboard boat engine revolves around a picnic that Cary and Evinrude enjoyed on Okauchee Lake, in the lake country west of Milwaukee, two and one-half miles from shore. Cary expressed a desire for a dish of ice cream and Evinrude rowed back to shore for it. Of course, the ice cream was melted by the time he returned, but Evinrude, inspired by the incident, was determined to design an engine that would replace the oar as a means of boat propulsion.

Cary and Evinrude were married in 1906. In 1907, Evinrude founded Evinrude Motors in Milwaukee. The firm immediately began to develop its first outboard motor, a one-cylinder,  model, which became an instant success upon its introduction in 1909.

Because of Bessie's poor health, the Evinrudes sold their company in 1913, and Ole agreed to not re-enter the outboard motor business for five years. His inventive mind kept busy, however, and during his "retirement", he devised a much-improved, two-cylinder outboard engine. In 1921 he and Bessie formed the ELTO Outboard Motor Company (ELTO standing for Evinrude's Light Twin Outboard). This new outboard engine was also very successful, and in 1929 the ELTO company merged with the original Evinrude company (since renamed the Outboard Marine Corporation) and the Lockwood Motor Company, with Evinrude the president of this new company.

Bessie, who had retired in 1928 for health reasons, died in 1933 in Milwaukee. Ole Evinrude died the following year on July 12 in Milwaukee, and the company was taken over by their son, Ralph. In 1936 the Evinrude company merged with the Johnson Motor Company to form the Outboard Marine Corporation. During World War II the company manufactured motors for various types of military marine craft.

In the 1930s and 1940s, 4-60 engines were used in midgets racers. These  Four 4 cylinder, water-cooled horizontally opposed engines ran on special racing fuel:  82% methanol, 10% toluene or benzol, and 8% castor oil (which was available in  cans from drug stores), plus tetraethyllead (also available in drug stores) to avoid engine knock. They would rev close to 8,000 rpm and could produce , close to 1 horsepower per pound (0.6 kW/kg) of engine weight.

OMC declared chapter 11 bankruptcy in 2000 and its assets were subsequently acquired by Bombardier Recreational Products, which continued to build Evinrude branded outboard motors. 

On May 27, 2020, BRP announced that they would be retiring the Evinrude brand and would exit the outboard boat motor market, in favor of manufacturing recreational boats.  BRP also announced a partnership with what it termed "market leader" Mercury Marine to supply power packages to their craft.

According to BRP's press release announcing the Evinrude discontinuation, “'Our outboard engines business has been greatly impacted by COVID-19, obliging us to discontinue production of our outboard motors immediately. This business segment had already been facing some challenges and the impact from the current context has forced our hand,' said José Boisjoli, President and CEO of BRP. 'We will concentrate our efforts on new and innovative technologies and on the development of our boat companies, where we continue to see a lot of potential to transform the on-water experience for consumers,' he added.” 

BRP claimed it "will continue to supply customers and our dealer network service parts and will honour our manufacturer limited warranties, plus offer select programs to manage inventory."  A statement it followed with an extended disclaimer on "Forward Looking Statements" disavowing any obligation to comply with what it said. 

The discontinuation occurred in spite of modern Evinrude E-TEC engines being among the lowest emission and highest power-to-weight ratio outboards produced, in large " due to a technological choice not understood by boaters", according to a yachting trade magazine, and reflected in the contrast between the superior environmental performance of the Evinrude E-TEC engine versus four-stroke engine alternatives, incorrectly perceived as more environmentally friendly. The Evinrude E-TEC was the first outboard engine technology to win the US Environmental Protection Agency's Clean Air Excellence Award, which recognizes low emission levels.  According to the EPA, when compared to a similar four-stroke engine at the time of the award, carbon monoxide emissions with Evinrude E-TEC were typically 30 to 50 percent lower; and at idle are lower by a factor of 50 to 100 times. In addition, Evinrude E-TEC emit 30 to 40 percent less total particulate matter on a weight basis than a similar “ultra-low emissions” four-stroke outboard. Furthermore, oxides of nitrogen and hydrocarbon emissions for Evinrude E-TEC are similar to, if not lower than, a four-stroke outboard.

Evinrude's name continued not only on many an outboard motor but also by the presentation of the Ole Evinrude Award. Given annually between 1955 and 1986 by the New York Boat Show, it was presented in recognition of an individual's contributions to the growth of recreational boating. It also gained worldwide popular fame when the name of a character in the animated feature film, The Rescuers echoed that of the company.

References

External links
Evinrude Official Site
Bombardier Recreational Products Official Site
A History of Evinrude
Evinrude Service Manual

Bombardier Recreational Products
Marine engine manufacturers
Engine manufacturers of the United States